Željko Franulović and Balázs Taróczy were the defending champions, but did not participate together this year.  Franulović partnered José López-Maeso, losing in the quarterfinals.   Taróczy partnered Heinz Günthardt, winning the title.

Günthardt and Taróczy won the title, defeating Pavel Složil and Tomáš Šmíd 6–4, 3–6, 6–2 in the final.

Seeds

  Heinz Günthardt /  Balázs Taróczy (champions)
  Pavel Složil /  Tomáš Šmíd (final)
  Fred McNair /  Raymond Moore (quarterfinals)
  José Luis Damiani /  Ricardo Ycaza (semifinals)

Draw

Draw

References
Draw

1981 in Swiss sport
1981 Grand Prix (tennis)
1981 Geneva Open